Midge Whiteman is a former Australian race driver who contested the 1967 Gallaher 500 with Jane Richardson in a Morris 1100S. They beat an all-male team in with an identical car, and still remain one of two all-female team to ever finish the Bathurst 500 (now the Bathurst 1000).

The second team to finish was in 1968 at the Hardie-Ferodo 500, with the team of Whiteman and Christine Cole finishing 5th in their class.

References 

https://news.google.com/newspapers?nid=1301&dat=19670924&id=Ef1jAAAAIBAJ&sjid=JOcDAAAAIBAJ&pg=1757,8698083&hl=en/ref

Australian racing drivers
Living people
Year of birth missing (living people)